Naity (Bangla: নৈটী, also written as নৈটি) is a census town in Chanditala II Block in Srirampore subdivision of Hooghly district in the state of West Bengal, India. Naity is in between Janai and Chanditala― two historical villages of Bengal and the village is in the eastern bank of the river Saraswati. The village Naity has two parts― North Naity and South Naity. North Naity's nearest railway station is Janai Road and South Naity's nearest railway station is Gobra. The school in Naity was founded in 1942.

Geography

Location

Kharsarai, Tisa, Kapashanria, Jaykrishnapur, Purba Tajpur, Begampur, Baksa, Panchghara, Chikrand, Janai, Pairagachha, Naity, Barijhati, Garalgachha and Krishnapur, all the census towns form a series from the northern part of Chanditala II CD Block to its southern part. The only municipality in the area, Dankuni, located outside the CD Block, occupies the south-east corner of the entire cluster.

Urbanisation
Srirampore subdivision is the most urbanized of the subdivisions in Hooghly district. 73.13% of the population in the subdivision is urban and 26.88% is rural. The subdivision has 6 municipalities and 34 census towns. The municipalities are: Uttarpara Kotrung Municipality, Konnagar Municipality, Serampore Municipality, Baidyabati Municipality, Rishra Municipality and Dankuni Municipality. Amongst the CD Blocks in the subdivision, Uttarapara Serampore (census towns shown in a separate map) had 76% urban population, Chanditala I 42%, Chanditala II 69% and Jangipara 7% (census towns shown in the map above). All places marked in the map are linked in the larger full screen map.

Naity Gram panchayat
Villages and census towns in Naity gram panchayat are: Adan, Bankagachha, Chikrand, Danpatipur and Naity.

Demographics
As per 2011 Census of India Naity had a total population of 6,996 of which 3,565 (51%) were males and 3,431 (49%) were females. Population below 6 years was 631. The total number of literates in Naity was 5,336 (83.83% of the population over 6 years).

Dankuni Urban Agglomeration
As per the 2011 census, Dankuni Urban Agglomeration includes: Dankuni (M), Purba Tajpur (CT), Kharsarai (CT), Begampur (CT), Chikrand (CT), Pairagachha (CT), Barijhati (CT), Garalgachha (CT), Krishnapur (CT), Baruipara (CT), Borai (CT), Nawapara (CT), Basai (CT), Gangadharpur (CT),  Manirampur (CT), Janai (CT), Kapashanria (CT), Jaykrishnapur (CT), Tisa (CT), Baksa (CT), Panchghara (CT) and Naity (CT).

Transport 

Education 
 Naity High School 

Established in Year: 1942
Management:  Dept. of Education, Govt. of West Bengal 
Coeducation: Co-Educational 
Medium of Instruction: Bengali

References

Census towns in Chanditala II CD Block